The Primera División is the women's premier futsal league in Spain, is operated by the Liga Nacional de Fútbol Sala. It was founded in 1994, which is played under UEFA rules and currently consists of 16 teams.

Liga championship rules

Each team has to play with all the other teams twice, once at home and the other at the opponent's stadium. This means that in Primera División Femenina the league ends after every team plays 30 matches.

Like men's Primera División, the Primera División Femenina de Futsal takes a winter break once each team has played half its schedule. One unusual feature of the league is that the two halves of the season are played in the same order—that is, the order of each team's first-half fixtures is repeated in the second half of the season, with the only difference being the stadiums used.

Each victory adds 3 points to the team in the league ranking. Each drawn adds 1 point.
At the end of the league, the winner is:
The team that has most points in the ranking.
If two or more teams are level on points, the winner is the team that has the best results head-to-head.
If there is no winner after applying the second rule, then the team with the best overall goal difference wins.

Champions by year
Source: Futsalplanet

Performance by club

References

External links
Official website
Futsalplanet

 

women
Women
Women
Spain
1994 establishments in Spain
Sports leagues established in 1994